COPA Heizung GmbH is a Germany-based company with production facilities in Turkey with a capacity of nearly 2 million pieces of radiators annually. The company has been established in 2005 in Oberhausen city of Germany and moved to its current location in Mülheim an der Ruhr Germany in 2007.

Companies based in North Rhine-Westphalia